William Edward "B. E." Taylor (March 18, 1951 – August 7, 2016) was the lead singer of the pop rock band B. E. Taylor Group and a solo artist. The group's 1983 single, "Vitamin L", reached No. 66 on the Billboard 100 singles chart.

Life and career
Hailing from Aliquippa, Pennsylvania, he was the eldest of three sons of Bill and Betty Taylor. Born William Edward, he was called 'Billy Eddie' by his mother, which he eventually shortened to B. E. While in high school, he formed B.E. Taylor and The Establishment.

In the early 1980s, Taylor joined with three former members of the progressive rock band Crack the Sky - Rick Witkowski (guitar), Joe Macre (bass), and Joey D'Amico (drums) - along with keyboardist Nat Kerr to form the B.E. Taylor Group.  The group generated some noise during the first half of the 1980s, particularly in 1984, when they scored MTV video rotation and a Billboard regional No. 1 hit with the song "Vitamin L." Although the band ceased recording together after their 1986 album Our World, Taylor did continue to collaborate with Witkowski throughout his career.

Taylor moved to Wheeling, West Virginia in the mid-1980s.

In 1991, Taylor, a dedicated Christian, contributed a reworking of “Silent Night” to a local radio station’s Christmas compilation, launching his second career as a holiday performer.

Taylor went on to record five solo albums and developed a following in the adult contemporary market with his annual Christmas tours. He had also performed for many popular television programs in the 1990s, including the award-winning LightMusic, for which he was the music director, Nickelodeon, and its night-time programming block, Nick At Nite.

In 2008, Taylor was awarded the Duquesne University Lifetime Achievement Award.

On September 10, 2021 B.E. Taylor was inducted into the Wheeling Hall of Fame in a ceremony, celebration and dinner at the WesBanco Arena in Wheeling, WV.

Later years and death
In March 2007, Taylor was diagnosed with an inoperable brain tumor. During the years of treatment, he released the album B. E. Taylor Christmas 3 and a concert DVD, completed eight Christmas tours, took part in Valentine and summer concerts.

He died on August 7, 2016, aged 65 from complications of the tumor. He was survived by his wife Veronica (née DeBlasis) Taylor and two children, B.C. and Tahnee.

Discography

With B. E. Taylor Group

Albums
Innermission (1982)
Love Won the Fight (1983)
Life Goes On EP (1984)
Our World (1986)

Singles
"Never Hold Back" (1982) - #54 Billboard Mainstream Rock Tracks
"Love Won the Fight" (1983)
"Just A Beat Away" (1983)
"Vitamin L" (1984) - #66 Billboard Hot 100
"Dangerous Rhythm" (1986)
"Reggae Rock & Roll" (1986)
"Karen" (1986) - #94 Billboard Hot 100

As a solo artist

Albums
B. E. Taylor Christmas (1994)
Try Love (1997)
B. E. Taylor Christmas 2 (2000)
One Nation Under God (2004)
Love Never Fails (2006)
B. E. Taylor Christmas 3 (2012)

Singles 
 "This Time" (1997) - #29 Gavin Adult Contemporary
 "Love You All Over Again" (1997) - #28 Gavin Adult Contemporary
 "Let There Be Peace On Earth" (2002)

References

External links
 Official B. E Taylor website

1951 births
2016 deaths
American performers of Christian music
Deaths from cancer in West Virginia
Deaths from brain cancer in the United States
People from Aliquippa, Pennsylvania
Singers from West Virginia